Aleksander Biermann Stenseth (born 22 July 2000) is a Norwegian football midfielder who plays for Strømsgodset.

A youth product of Klemetsrud and Skeid, he joined the junior team of Strømsgodset in 2018. He signed a professional contract with Strømsgodset in the summer of 2020. He made his Eliteserien debut in September 2020 against Sandefjord.

References

2000 births
Living people
Footballers from Oslo
Norwegian footballers
Strømsgodset Toppfotball players
Eliteserien players
Association football midfielders